Panarit is a community in the Korçë County, southeastern Albania. At the 2015 local government reform it became part of the municipality Korçë.

Notable people
Iljaz Hoxha, famous janissary and founder of the first mosque in Korçë
Gjergj Panariti, Albanian painter of the 19th century

References

Populated places in Korçë
Villages in Korçë County